Maude Frazier (April 4, 1881 – June 20, 1963) was an American politician. She was the first female lieutenant governor of Nevada. Before entering politics, Frazier was a teacher, principal and school superintendent. She was a member of the Democratic Party

Frazier served in the Nevada Assembly from her first election in 1950 until 1962, when she was appointed Lieutenant Governor by Gov. Grant Sawyer to fill the vacancy caused by the death of Rex Bell. She served the remaining six months in Bell's term, retired and died within a year of leaving office.

In the legislature, Frazier was the driving force behind the establishment of the first public college in southern Nevada, which eventually became the University of Nevada, Las Vegas.  The first building on the campus was named Maude Frazier Hall and completed in 1957.

See also
List of female lieutenant governors in the United States

References

External links
 Construction photos of Maude Frazier Hall at UNLV from UNLV Libraries Special Collections.
 Demolition video of Maude Frazier Hall from Uncle Jack's Very Vintage Vegas site.
 "Take a long look at Frazier Hall,"  building history from Las Vegas Sun.
 "Frazier is more than just a name on a building," memories of Maude Frazier from Las Vegas Sun article about plans to demolish Frazier Hall.
 "Old, ugly, and in the way", - Las Vegas City Life article.
 The University of Nevada, Las Vegas: a history by Eugene Moehring, University of Nevada Press, 2007.
 The First 100 Persons Who Shaped Southern Nevada
 Grant Free
 A Guide to the Maude Frazier Collection, University of Nevada, Reno, Special Collections

1881 births
1963 deaths
Lieutenant Governors of Nevada
Democratic Party members of the Nevada Assembly
People from the Las Vegas Valley
Women state legislators in Nevada
20th-century American politicians
20th-century American women politicians